The 2018 Formula 4 United States Championship season was the third season of the United States Formula 4 Championship, a motor racing series regulated according to FIA Formula 4 regulations and sanctioned by SCCA Pro Racing, the professional racing division of the Sports Car Club of America.

Teams and drivers 
All teams were American-registered.

Race calendar

The calendar was unveiled on 9 December 2017. All races were held in the United States.

Championship standings

Points were awarded as follows:

Drivers' standings

Teams' standings

Notes

References

External links 
 

United States
United States F4 Championship seasons
F4 United States Championship
United States F4